Great Swamp Brook (Great Swamp Branch on federal maps) is a  tributary of Nescochague Creek in the southern New Jersey Pine Barrens in the United States.

See also
List of rivers of New Jersey

References

Tributaries of the Mullica River
Rivers in the Pine Barrens (New Jersey)
Rivers of New Jersey
Rivers of Atlantic County, New Jersey